Transformers: Lost Light is an American science fiction / action-adventure comic book written by James Roberts and published by IDW Publishing, taking place in their Transformers universe. Lost Light acts as a sequel to The Transformers: More than Meets the Eye which was published from 2012 to 2016, also written by Roberts. Following the "Revolution" event which integrated numerous of Hasbro's franchises into the Hasbro Comic Book Universe, including Transformers, More than Meets the Eye ended with #57 and was continued with Lost Light from December 2016 to November 2018.

The story focuses on Rodimus and his crew attempting to find the Knights of Cybertron. After having been stranded on Necroworld by Getaway, the crew of the Lost Light attempt to return to Cybertron to gain access to another ship, only to realize that they've been transported into an alternate universe.

The comic book series has received a positive response from critics as did More than Meets the Eye.

The comic continues the LGBT themes from More Than Meets the Eye by featuring transgender female Transformers Anode and Lug who are also a same-sex couple.

Plot

Volume 1: Dissolution

Volume 2: Troja Major and The Mutineers' Trilogy

Volume 3: The Scavengers and The Everlasting Voices

Volume 4: Crucible

Production and publication
Following the "Revolution" event, it was announced that The Transformers: More than Meets the Eye would be ending with issue #57 and be followed by Transformers: Lost Light, which serves as "season three" of the story. As with MTMTE, James Roberts serves as the writer of Transformers: Lost Light, with art by Jack Lawrence.

Reception

Critical response

Commercial performance
Transformers: Lost Light #1 debuted at number 176 on Diamond Comic Distributors best-selling comics ranking for December 2016, with 11,342 copies distributed, being the ninth best-selling comic of IDW Publishing in that month.

References

Lost Light
IDW Publishing titles
LGBT-related comics